Ann Margaret Lanchester (fl. 1802 – fl. 1810), was a British fashion merchant and fashion designer.  She was a leading figure within the British fashion industry and referred to as 'The Bonaparte of her day' in the contemporary The Complete Book of Trades.   She made regular trips to Paris to study fashion, published the exclusive fashion magazine Le Miroir de la Mode for the British nobility, where she illustrated the contemporary fashion through her own dress models, which she sold in her shop in New Bond Street in London (in 1806 moved to St James's Street).

See also
 Mary Ann Bell

References

Year of birth missing
Year of death missing
19th-century English businesspeople
British fashion designers
British fashion journalists
19th-century English businesswomen
British women fashion designers